The 2021–22 season is Virtus Bologna's 93rd in existence and the club's 5th consecutive season in the top flight of Italian basketball.

Kit 
Supplier: Macron / Sponsor: Segafredo

Players

Current roster

Depth chart

Squad changes

In

|}

Out

|}

Confirmed

|}

Coach

On loan

Competitions

Supercup

Quarterfinal

Semifinal

Final

Serie A

EuroCup

Regular season

Playoffs

Eightfinal

Quarterfinal

Semifinal

Final

References 

2021–22 in Italian basketball by club
2021–22 EuroCup Basketball by club